Stanley Barstow FRSL (28 June 1928 – 1 August 2011) was an English novelist.

Biography
Barstow was born in Horbury, near Wakefield in the West Riding of Yorkshire. His father was a coal miner and he attended Ossett Grammar School. He worked as a draughtsman and salesman for an engineering company. He was best known for his 1960 novel A Kind of Loving, which has been turned into a film, a television series, a radio play and a stage play. The author's other novels included Ask Me Tomorrow (1962), The Watchers on the Shore (1966) and The Right True End (1976). He frequently attended public events in Ossett, where he grew up, and Horbury, his birthplace.

Barstow's other works included Joby, which was turned into a television play starring Patrick Stewart, A Raging Calm, A Season with Eros, A Brother’s Tale, Just You Wait and See, Modern Delights and an autobiography, In My Own Good Time (2001). He also wrote plays and short stories.

Barstow married Connie Kershaw in 1951 with whom he had two children, Neil and Gillian. In the late 1980s, he met Diana Griffiths who was beginning to learn her trade as a writer with Barstow's help. He and Connie Kershaw separated in 1990, though never divorced. Stan started a new life with Griffiths, now a writer in her own right, with eight original plays and nearly twenty dramatisations to her credit. Later he lived in Pontardawe, South Wales, with her. Stan Barstow died on 1 August 2011, aged 83.

The Stan Barstow Memorial Garden in Horbury is named after him.

Bibliography
Novels
 A Kind of Loving (1960)
 Ask Me Tomorrow (1962)
 Joby (1964)
 The Watchers on the Shore (1966)
 A Raging Calm (1968)
 Through the Green Woods (1968)
 The Right True End (1976)
 A Brother's Tale (1980)
 Just You Wait and See (1986)
 B-Movie (1987)
 Give Us This Day (1989)
 Next of Kin (1991)

Short Story Collections
 The Desperados and Other Stories (1961)
 The Human Element and Other Stories (1969)
 A Season with Eros (1971)
 A Casual Acquaintance and Other Stories (1976)
 The Glad Eye and Other Stories (1984)
 The Likes of Us: Stories of Five Decades (2013)

Plays
 Stringer's Last Stand (1972) (with Alfred Bradley)
 Joby: a Television Play (1977)
 'We Could Always Fit a Sidecar' in Out of the Air: Five Plays for Radio (1978)
 The Human Element, and Albert's Part: Two Television Plays (1984)

Autobiography
 In My Own Good Time (2001)

References

External links
 Website containing detailed information
 
 Barstow's radio plays
 Daily Telegraph obituary
 The Independent obituary
 Guardian Review of "The Likes of Us", collected short stories, published 2013.
 Archival Material at  

1928 births
2011 deaths
Fellows of the Royal Society of Literature
Alumni of the Open University
People from Horbury
English male novelists
20th-century English novelists
Proletarian literature